The Airport line is a commuter rail service on the Transperth network, in Perth, Western Australia, that officially opened on 9 October 2022, with regular services commencing the following day. The section between High Wycombe and Bayswater uses all new infrastructure, built between 2016 and 2022. In contrast, the section between Bayswater and Perth shares infrastructure with the Midland and Morley–Ellenbrook lines, and the section between Perth and Claremont with the Fremantle line.

The new infrastructure between High Wycombe and Bayswater was constructed as part of the Forrestfield–Airport Link project, the purpose of which was to provide a rail service to the airport and to the areas east of the airport. As part of the project, three new stations were constructed, namely Redcliffe, Airport Central, and High Wycombe.

History

Forrestfield–Airport Link
In 2004, Perth Airport's twenty-year Master Plan proposed a rail link to connect with the Midland line between Bayswater and Ashfield stations near Tonkin Highway. The proposed link would have continued above ground parallel to Tonkin Highway to Great Eastern Highway, after which it would have continued along Brearley Avenue to the current domestic terminal. A future extension would have taken it underground from the domestic terminal to terminate at the international terminal. There would have been stations near the intersection of Tonkin Highway and Great Eastern Highway (named Redcliffe station), and at both the domestic and international terminals.

In December 2012, the opposition Labor Party proposed an airport rail link as part of its Metronet scheme. The proposed route would have branched from the Midland line after Bayswater and followed Tonkin Highway until Epsom Park, after which it would loop around the outskirts of the airport runway to near the airport parking, before continuing east and then terminating at Dundas Road. There would have been three stations: Airport West/Redcliffe on Tonkin Highway near Ryans Court, Perth Airport near the intersection of Horrie Miller Drive and Palridge Road, and Forrestfield/High Wycombe in its current position. There would have been a short tunneled section between Perth Airport and Forrestfield/High Wycombe stations underneath a future runway, with the rest above ground.

In February 2013, the Government of Western Australia responded with an alternative proposal that would instead run in a tunnel under the existing runway to allow directly serving both airport terminals. The proposed link would also branch from the Midland line at Bayswater and have three stations, with one on either side of a station serving the main terminal. Its stated advantages included avoiding requiring a shuttle bus between the terminals and the stations.

In December 2013, the Government of Western Australia announced its intention to construct a railway line to Forrestfield via Perth Airport. In August 2014, the scheme was endorsed by the Cabinet.

The state government formally approved the project in August 2014.

In March 2015, it was announced five parties had lodged Expressions of Interest to build the line:
Connecting Forrestfield: (Lendlease & Ghella) 
CRCC-BGC-VDM Joint Venture: (China Railway Construction Corporation, BGC & VDM) 
Forrestfield Connect: (Acciona, BAM Nuttall & Ferrovial Agroman) 
JHL Joint Venture: (Leighton Contractors & John Holland) 
SI-NRW Joint Venture: (Salini Impregilo & NRW)

A shortlist of Forrestfield Connect, JHL Joint Venture and SI-NRW Joint Venture was announced in April 2015. In January 2016, the SI-NRW Joint Venture was named as the preferred tenderer. They were awarded the $1.176 billion contract for the design, construction, and 10 years maintenance, in April 2016. Construction on the project commenced on 3 November 2016.

The first tunnel boring machine (TBM) started tunnelling from High Wycombe on 30 July 2017. The TBM was named Grace, after a local girl who was undergoing treatment for leukaemia. The second TBM started tunnelling from High Wycombe in October 2017. This TBM was named Sandy, after sandgroper, a digging insect native to Western Australia, and a nickname for Western Australians.

In December 2018, Western Australian Transport Minister Rita Saffioti announced that the project's opening had been delayed to mid-2021 due to numerous problems encountered by the project, including a sinkhole, flooding, the TBMs moving slower than expected and two workplace incidents related to the project. Despite this, the project budget of $1.8 billion remained the same.

On 18 February 2020, TBM Grace reached the Bayswater tunnel dive structure, the end of the tunnel. On 20 April 2020, TBM Sandy reached the Bayswater tunnel dive structure, marking the completion of tunnelling for the project.

Originally conceived as the Forrestfield–Airport Link, the rail service was renamed Airport Line. Additionally, Belmont Station was renamed Redcliffe Station and Forrestfield Station to High Wycombe Station.

After initially denying that construction was behind schedule, Saffioti said in May 2021 that the planned completion date of the line had been again pushed back, this time to the first half of 2022. She put the delay down to the COVID-19 pandemic causing a delay in the production of steel and other materials, however the project will still come in on budget due to contingencies in the contract.

In July, the head contractors commenced legal action against GHD Group, alleging it was negligent in failing to prepare an adequate design concept. The contractors, Webuild and NRW claimed they suffered a loss in the construction of the railway line as a result of GHD breaching the tender design agreement.

On 16 July 2021, track laying was completed. Installation of the overhead conductor rail and overhead line equipment is still continuing as of July 2021, as is the final fit-out of the three stations on the line.

The tunnel received its first train on the morning of 28 March 2022 in order to test the tunnel's ventilation system with a driver and a group of engineers on board. An interview with Saffioti on 3 April 2022 had the minister reiterate the intention to have the line open by the end of June 2022. Following the state budget on 12 May 2022, the government changed its position on the line's opening date, with it now saying the line will open some time later in the year. The Auditor General stated that the estimated completion date is July 2022. Driver training began on 8 August 2022. On 16 August 2022, the official opening date was announced as 9 October 2022, with regular services commencing 10 October. A family fun day occurred on 9 October at High Wycombe and Redcliffe stations and Transperth travel was free that day.

Other works
To allow trains of the Airport line to turn around at Claremont, turnbacks were installed at Claremont Station. The station also underwent an upgrade. The work for the turnbacks was completed in May 2021.

To aid with Airport line operations, a turnback will be installed west of Bayswater Station. Bayswater is also undergoing an upgrade.

The Caledonian Avenue level crossing between Meltham and Maylands stations closed on 15 April 2022 as the addition of the Airport line would make this level crossing too busy.

Route
The new Airport line diverges from Transperth's existing Midland line near Bayswater Station and runs in twin-bore tunnels, initially paralleling the Tonkin Highway, then running under the Swan River to reach Perth Airport. It continues in tunnels under the airport, before emerging to terminate at a new bus-rail interchange at High Wycombe.

From Bayswater in the other direction, the Airport line shares infrastructure with the Midland line towards Perth. West of Perth, the line continues, sharing infrastructure with the Fremantle line until Claremont, where the Airport line terminates.

Stations

The new Airport line services three new stations, as well as the stations between Bayswater and Claremont that used to be serviced by the Midland and Fremantle lines only.

Service
Since 10 October 2022,  Airport line services operate every 12 minutes during peak and every 15 minutes outside peak and on weekends and public holidays. At night, services reduce to every half hour or every hour. A few services in the early morning and at night only run between Perth and High Wycombe, with the rest of the services running the full length of the line. In 2017, Transport Minister Rita Saffioti said that she would like the Airport line to operate earlier than 5 am to cater for FIFO flights. However, the operating hours later revealed had the first train depart Perth bound for High Wycombe at 5:12 am on weekdays, 5:45 on Saturdays, and 7:08 am on Sundays and public holidays. These operating hours have been criticised as not meeting early morning FIFO flights, but the government says that the Airport line meets 80% to 85% of all flights in and out of Perth Airport, and that the line needs to be free for maintenance at night. The 12 minute peak frequency required the Midland and Fremantle lines to reduce their peak frequency from every 10 minutes upon the Airport line's opening.

Rolling stock
The Airport line is operated by Transperth B-series trains. The government ordered 10 additional B-series trains from Downer–Bombardier for the Airport line, the last of which entered service in June 2019.

References

3 ft 6 in gauge railways in Australia
Airport rail links in Australia
Railway lines in Perth, Western Australia
Perth Airport
Railway lines opened in 2022
Underground commuter rail
Airport line, Perth